Mill Creek Plantation, also known as Greenridge Plantation, near Thomasville in Thomas County, Georgia, is a  property which is listed on the National Register of Historic Places.

It includes a Tudor Revival mansion designed by S. Ralph Fetner.  The property includes six contributing buildings and three contributing structures, as well as seven non-contributing buildings and structures.

In 1997, at the time of its NRHP listing, it was one of 71 operating plantations in the Red Hills region, which spans from Thomasville to Tallahassee, Florida.  The property was deemed significant for the architecture of the house, and in the area of recreation/entertainment as one of few surviving plantations in the Red Hills region which was developed for game bird hunting.

References

Houses on the National Register of Historic Places in Georgia (U.S. state)
Tudor Revival architecture in the United States
Houses completed in 1938
Houses in Thomas County, Georgia
Plantations in Georgia (U.S. state)
National Register of Historic Places in Thomas County, Georgia